Settled Out of Court is a 1959 comedy crime novel by the British writer Henry Cecil. It was published in the United States by Harper.

In 1960 it was adapted into a play of the same title co-written by Cecil and William Saroyan. It was a success running for nearly a year at the Savoy Theatre in London's West End.

References

Bibliography
 Kabatchnik, Amnon. Blood on the Stage, 1950-1975: Milestone Plays of Crime, Mystery, and Detection. Scarecrow Press, 2011.
 Reilly, John M. Twentieth Century Crime & Mystery Writers. Springer, 2015.

1959 British novels
Novels by Henry Cecil
British comedy novels
British novels adapted into plays
Michael Joseph books